Michael Faulds (born November 11, 1983) is a former Canadian football quarterback and the current head coach for the Wilfrid Laurier Golden Hawks football team. After serving three years as the offensive coordinator for the York Lions, he was hired as head coach for Wilfrid Laurier on January 8, 2013.

Playing career
Faulds completed his five year playing career in CIS football with the Western Ontario Mustangs as the team's starting quarterback. Faulds set the all-time CIS passing yards record in 2009 with 10,811 yards. He held the record until it was broken by Sherbrooke's Jérémi Roch in 2015.

References

Further reading
Wilfrid Laurier biography
Michael Faulds biography

1983 births
Living people
Players of Canadian football from Ontario
Canadian football quarterbacks
Western Mustangs football players
People from Wellington County, Ontario
Wilfrid Laurier Golden Hawks football coaches
York Lions football coaches